Asif Ashfaq (born 24 October 1990) is a Pakistani first-class cricketer who played for Lahore cricket team.

References

External links
 

1990 births
Living people
Pakistani cricketers
Lahore cricketers
Cricketers from Lahore